Enzo Prono (born 27 June 1991) is a retired Paraguayan footballer who last played for Alebrijes de Oaxaca, as a striker.

Career

Early career
Born in Asunción, Prono started his career with lowly Fernando de la Mora and subsequently joined Libertad, playing there until 2010. After one year with Libertad he moved to Europe, and had trials with Italian and Belgian clubs.

Sol de America
In 2011, Prono returned to his native country and joined Club Sol de América. He made his debut on 24 April, coming on as a late substitute in a 0–2 loss at Olimpia. He scored his first professional goal on 20 August, netting his side's only of a draw at Tacuary. He was an ever-present figure during the campaign, as Sol de America narrowly avoided relegation.

Olimpia
On 12 January 2013, Prono joined Club Olimpia in a one-year loan deal with a buyout clause.

Arsenal de Sarandí
On 27 June 2014, it was reported that Prono had joined Argentine Primera División club Arsenal de Sarandí on an 18-month loan deal.

International career
On 10 February 2012, Prono was called up to Paraguay national football team.
Five days later, he made his international debut, coming off the bench to replace José Ortigoza in the last 3 minutes of the 2–0 victory against Chile.

Playing style
Prono is one of the greatest prospects of Paraguayan football. He is compared with Radamel Falcao and Lucas Barrios. His main ability, despite being a 178 cm tall, is his headers. This began in the Libertad youth system, when the youth coach told Prono to throw a ball in a wall and head it every day.

References

External links
 Profile at BDFA 
 

1991 births
Living people
Sportspeople from Asunción
Paraguayan footballers
Association football forwards
Paraguayan Primera División players
I-League players
Ascenso MX players
Club Sol de América footballers
Club Olimpia footballers
General Díaz footballers
Arsenal de Sarandí footballers
Atlante F.C. footballers
Zulia F.C. players
Aizawl FC players
Alebrijes de Oaxaca players
Paraguay international footballers
Paraguayan expatriate footballers
Expatriate footballers in Argentina
Paraguayan expatriate sportspeople in Argentina
Expatriate footballers in Mexico
Paraguayan expatriate sportspeople in Mexico